Wallace Ford (born Samuel Grundy Jones; 12 February 1898 – 11 June 1966) was an English-born naturalized American vaudevillian, stage performer and screen actor. Usually playing wise-cracking characters, he combined a tough but friendly-faced demeanor with a small but powerful, stocky physique.

Early life
He was born Samuel Grundy Jones in Bolton, Lancashire, England, into a working-class family of limited means. At the age of three, he was placed by his uncle and aunt, in whose care he had been, into a Barnardo's orphanage home, since they were unable to maintain his upkeep along with their own several children. When he was seven, he and other children from similar backgrounds were shipped to Canada to be found new homes with farming foster families as a part of the British Empire's ongoing programme to populate the territory.

Samuel was adopted by a family in Manitoba. He was ill-treated and became a serial runaway, being resettled several times with different families by the Canadian authorities. According to his own account, at the age of 11 he ran away for the last time and joined a vaudeville traveling troupe touring Canada called the Winnipeg Kiddies, from which he acquired his initial training as a performer.

In 1914, 16-year-old Samuel and another youth named Wallace Ford decided to head south to the United States to seek their fortunes, riding a freight train illicitly. During the trip, Ford was killed beneath the wheels of a train. Later, Samuel adopted as his stage name the name of his dead traveling companion.

Acting career

Following military service as a trooper at Fort Riley, Kansas, with the United States Cavalry during World War I, he became a vaudeville stage actor in an American stock company. In 1919, he performed in an adaptation of Booth Tarkington's Seventeen, which played to full houses in Chicago for several months, before transferring to a successful run on Broadway in New York City. Ford became a successful Broadway performer through the Roaring Twenties, appearing in multiple productions, including the lead role in the Broadway smash hit Abie's Irish Rose.

In motion pictures, he made his credited debut with Possessed in 1931, appearing with Clark Gable and Joan Crawford, and the next year he was given the lead in Metro-Goldwyn-Mayer's Freaks, directed by Tod Browning. Ford went on to have an extensive career over 30 years, appearing in more than 150 films, with lead roles in the 1930s and '40s in Hollywood B movies such as The Rogues' Tavern (1936), Murder by Invitation (1941), and Roar of the Press (1941) and supporting roles in larger feature films such as The Lost Patrol (1934), Shadow of a Doubt (1943), Spellbound (1945), and Dead Reckoning (1947).

In 1937, he returned to the Broadway stage to play the role of George in the original production of Of Mice and Men.

In 1945, Ford appeared in the film Blood on the Sun alongside Jimmy Cagney, whose physique and acting style resembled his own. In the late 1940s and early 1950s, he transitioned into a character actor, appearing as a regular performer in the newly fashionable western genre, and in multiple John Ford productions as one of his preferred support players.

In the latter stage of his career, during the 1950s and early 1960s, Ford performed increasingly on television.  He had a recurring role in the Western series The Deputy starring Henry Fonda and his final appearance on the "small screen" was on The Andy Griffith Show in 1964, playing Roger Hanover, Aunt Bee's old flame. The next year, he appeared in his last film, A Patch of Blue, for which he received a Golden Laurel nomination. Ford's performance as Ole Pa in A Patch of Blue proved to be the final role of his extensive acting career.

Personal life
The actor became a naturalized United States citizen on May 8, 1942; by this act, he also legally changed his name from Samuel Grundy to Wallace Ford. He met his future wife, Martha Haworth, in 1922 while they were performing together on Broadway in Abie's Irish Rose, she being a chorus girl at the time. They had one child, a daughter named Patricia (1927–2005).

After the death of his wife in February 1966, Ford moved into the Motion Picture & Television Country House and Hospital at Woodland Hills, California, and died in the hospital there of heart failure four months later. His body was buried in an unmarked grave at Culver City's Holy Cross Cemetery.

Broadway credits

Filmography

Select television credits

References

External links

Literature on Wallace Ford

1898 births
1966 deaths
People from Bolton
English male film actors
English male stage actors
English male television actors
British emigrants to the United States
Burials at Holy Cross Cemetery, Culver City
Vaudeville performers
Male Western (genre) film actors
20th-century English male actors
United States Army soldiers
Naturalized citizens of the United States
United States Army personnel of World War I